The Chasicoan ( or ) age is a period of geologic time from 10–9 Ma within the Late Miocene epoch of the Neogene, used more specifically within the SALMA classification in South America. It follows the Mayoan and precedes the Huayquerian age.

Etymology 
The Chasicoan is named after the Arroyo Chasicó Formation of the Colorado Basin in northeastern Argentina.

Formations

Fossil content

References

Bibliography 
Arroyo Chasicó Formation
 
 
 

Bahía Inglesa Formation
 
 
 
 
 
 
 
 
 
 
 
 
 

Caujarao Formation
 

Cerro Azul Formation
 
 
 

Coquimbo Formation
 

Loma de Las Tapias Formation
 
 
 

Madre de Dios Formation
 
 
 

Mauri Formation
 

Navidad Formation
 

Palo Pintado Formation
 
 
 

Paraná Formation
 
 

Pebas Formation
 
 

Pisco Formation
 
 
 
 
 
 
 
 
 
 
 
 
 
 

Puerto Madryn Formation
 

Urumaco Formation
 
 
 
 
 

 
Miocene South America
Neogene Argentina